Google Questions and Answers (Google Otvety, Google Ответы) was a free knowledge market offered by Google that allowed users to collaboratively find good answers, through the web, to their questions (also referred as Google Knowledge Search). It was launched on June 28, 2007 and replaces the fee-based Google Answers service, discontinued on December 1, 2006. Google had chosen Russia as the first country to launch this new service.

The service was first launched in Russia, and then China, Thailand, Vietnam, and Indonesia, as well as 17 Arab and 40 African nations. Google targeted these nations because these nations did not have sufficient Web sites to be indexed by Google's search engine.  The Q&A system is an effective way to collect useful content and then be indexed by the search engine.

Technologically, Google service most closely resembles analogous services by mail.ru, Naver and Yahoo!. It is pseudonymous: the nicknames of the authors of questions and answers are shown right next to their contributed content. Google uses question tagging to help users find relevant questions. Google also finds high quality answers to similar questions previous asked and return them to the user to improve answer timeliness.  Furthermore, this service integrates search and converts a dissatisfied Web search (indicated by the fact that none of the returned results were clicked) to a question through natural language processing. Technical details are documented in Google's 2010 VLDB paper.

As most services of this kind, Google provides an incentive system to motivate people to answer questions. It is based on assigning points for actions and a system of levels loosely based on the Russian system of academic degrees. An interesting feature of the incentive system is that Google's reward for visiting is higher than for posting an answer.

On August 20, 2007, Google and Tianya Club, a Chinese community website, launched a free Q&A service entitled "Tianya Answers".

The site has since been launched in English and French as Google Baraza at a completely different URL.

Google closed its questions and answers website again on June 23, 2014 and made it read only.

Predecessor
Google Answers' predecessor was also called Google Questions and Answers and was launched in August 2001. The previous service had Google staffers e-mailing responses to questions for free. It was up and functional for about a day. The demand may have overwhelmed their resources.

Aardvark
Google bought a similar site, Aardvark, for $50 million in 2010, but discontinued it in 2011.  Google has closed other sites after integrating their services within their own software.

See also
 Genon.ru

Notes

External links
 Google Baraza 

Questions and Answers
Defunct websites
Internet properties established in 2007
Internet properties disestablished in 2014
Internet properties disestablished in 2015
Question-and-answer websites